The 24th Hazara Mountain Battery (Frontier Force) was an artillery battery of the British Indian Army.

Formation
The battery was raised in 1851, at Haripur in order to help defend the Hazara District of the North West Frontier.

Name changes
The battery has gone through many name changes -
Hazara Mountain Train
In 1856, Hazara Mountain Train Battery, Punjab Irregular Force
In 1865, Hazara Mountain Battery, Punjab Frontier Force
In 1876, No. 4 (Hazara) Mountain Battery, Punjab Frontier Force
In 1901, Hazara Mountain Battery
In 1903, 24th Hazara Mountain Battery (Frontier Force)
In 1920, 24th Hazara Pack Battery (Frontier Force)
In 1921, 104th (Hazara) Pack Battery (Frontier Force)
In 1927, 4th (Hazara) Mountain Battery (Frontier Force)
In 1932, 4th (Hazara) Mountain Battery, R.A., F.F.

History

The 4th soon saw action in numerous small campaigns on the North West Frontier. In 1878, the 4th took part in the Second Afghan War at the Battle of Ali Masjid, and later took part in the Siege of the Sherpur Cantonment in Kabul, where it remained as part of the garrison when the rest of the force marched on Kandahar. In 1885, the Battery took part in the Second Burmese War. It was at Hunza during the campaign in 1891. In 1895, the Battery was back fighting on the Frontier as part of the Chitral Expedition. To honour the visit of the Prince and Princess of Wales to Indian they took part in the Rawalpindi Parade 1905. 

During World War I, the 4th left India in 1917, for East Africa where it would remain until the Armistice. Between the wars, the Battery saw service in the Third Afghan War of 1919, the Afridi and Red Shirt Rebellion (1930–1), the Mohmand and Bajaur Operations (1933), and operations against the Fakir of Ipi in the Waziristan campaign 1936–1939. 

It was deployed in 1939 as part of the 22nd Mountain Regiment for the Malayan campaign of World War II. It took part in the Battle of Jitra and the Singapore and entered Japanese captivity with the rest of the garrison. Following the independence of India, the regiment was allotted to the Indian Army. Shortly after it took part in the Indo-Pakistani War of 1947–1948. The battery was transferred to 56 Mountain Composite Regiment (Pack) in April 1964.

Battle honours
The battery has the won the following battle honours-
Ali Masjid
Kabul, 1879
Afghanistan, 1878-80
Burma 1885–87
Chitral
E.Africa 1917-18
Jitra

See also
22 Medium Regiment
56 Field Regiment

Notes

References
Moberly, F.J. (1923). Official History of the War: Mesopotamia Campaign, Imperial War Museum.

Further reading
 

Artillery batteries
Indian World War I regiments
Indian World War II regiments
Military units and formations established in 1851
Artillery units and formations of British India
Hazara military personnel
1851 establishments in India